Novoivanovka is a rural locality (a village) in Polyakovsky Selsoviet, Davlekanovsky District, Bashkortostan, Russia. The population was 4 as of 2010. There is 1 street.

Geography 
Novoivanovka is located 24 km north of Davlekanovo (the district's administrative centre) by road. Volynka is the nearest rural locality.

References 

Rural localities in Davlekanovsky District